Gerald R. Miller (October 18, 1931 – May 20, 1993) was an American professor and notable author in the field of communication studies.

References

1931 births
People from Muscatine, Iowa
1993 deaths
Place of death missing
Communication scholars
20th-century scholars
Academics from Iowa
20th-century American non-fiction writers